Lake Lansing is a  lake in Haslett, Michigan just a few miles northeast of the state's capital city of Lansing.

Overview
Lake Lansing was originally known as Pine Lake, and was a highly popular recreation site in the early 1900s. The name was changed to Lake Lansing in 1930.  The lake soon began to decline in recreational popularity, and was neglected for many decades until it was dredged in 1978, restoring the health of the lake.  Around 280 residential homes surround the lake.  Two sailing clubs also have property on the lake. In addition there are two public parks.

A special assessment district created by the township enables education, ongoing testing, evaluation and management of the lake to control weeds, encourage phosphorus free fertilization, round up geese and other activities to keep the lake healthy and safe for recreational use.

The Lake Lansing Property Owners Association maintains a communication system for property owners, works for safety on the lake, sponsors numerous social activities and advocates on behalf of its members on riparian rights and other issues.

Sailing clubs
The Lansing Sailing Club sponsors an active program of racing and day sailing for sailboat owners as well as "learn to sail" programs for adults and junior sailing camps for students grades 5 thru 12.

The Michigan State University Sailing Center offers a "Learn to Sail" class, as well as other classes. The Center also offers a variety of memberships that enable individuals to sail MSU Sailing Center boats.

Public parks
Three public parks, one with trailer launching access, are operated by the Ingham County Parks Department. Lake Lansing Park South includes a band shell, boat rental, fishing dock, swimming beach, bath house, beach, volleyball courts, summer snack bar, horseshoe pits, picnic grounds, and shelters. Lake Lansing Park North is a 530 acre park with multiple hiking trails, playgrounds, and picnic areas. The Lake Lansing Boat Launch, located on the North side of Lake Lansing provides two boat launch ramps, a picnic area, basketball court, a powerboat washer and paved parking. Alcoholic beverages are prohibited in all of the parks.

Fishing
Lake Lansing is home to several types of fish including: Largemouth bass, Smallmouth bass, Northern pike, Carp, Crappie, Bluegill, Redear Sunfish, Perch, and several types of Catfish.

See also
List of lakes in Michigan

References

External links
 Lake Lansing Property Owners Association
 Lansing Sailing Club
 Michigan State University Sailing Center
 Ingham County Parks Department
 Lake Lansing Park North
 Lake Lansing Park South
 Lake Lansing Boat Launch
 Fishing pictures from lake lansing

Bodies of water of Ingham County, Michigan
Geography of Lansing, Michigan
Lansing